Tsang Chi Hau (born 12 January 1990 in Hong Kong) is a former Hong Kong professional footballer. 

His younger brother, Tsang Kin Fong, is also a former professional footballer.

Club career

Hong Kong 09
Tsang Chi Hau joined Hong Kong 09 in 2005, but then the team is dissolved because of the formation of Hong Kong C Team in 2007.

Workable
In 2007, Tsang Chi Hau joined the newly promoted team Workable after leaving Hong Kong 09. He was selected into match squad for 4 league games, although he did not feature any matches. Workable was relegated after competing in Hong Kong First Division League for one season. The team was dissolved after the relegation on 8 May 2008.

Eastern
Tsang Chi Hau followed Workable manager Chan Hiu Ming's and coach Lee Kin Wo's footstep and joined Eastern. He made his Hong Kong First Division League debut against Sun Hei as an 82nd-minute substitute for Rodrigo Andreis Galvão. He made 5 league appearances, which were all as substitute, and one league cup match.

Although Eastern avoided relegation as they were placed at 9th out of 13 teams, the team decided not to compete in Hong Kong First Division League and chose to compete in Hong Kong Third Division League in the next season. Therefore, Tsang Chi Hau chose to leave the club.

Happy Valley
Tsang Chi Hau joined Happy Valley after spending a season in Eastern. He made his debut for Happy Valley against Kitchee on 11 September 2009. He scored his first Hong Kong First Division League goal against Tai Chung on 16 January 2010. He played 13 league matches for Happy Valley in total. However, Happy Valley were relegated after placed at the bottom of the table. Thus, Tsang decided to leave the team.

Kitchee
Tsang Chi Hau decided to join Kitchee, playing with his younger brother again since they were playing at their father's club. However, Tsang was loaned to Tai Chung right after he joined the club.

On loan to Tai Chung
Tsang Chi Hau was loaned to Tai Chung after he joined Kitchee. He made 14 league appearances and scored 1 goal. He also featured one matches in Hong Kong Senior Challenge Shield, Hong Kong FA Cup and Hong Kong League Cup respectively.

On loan to Hong Kong Sapling
In the summer of 2011, Tsang, with his younger brother, were loaned to Hong Kong Sapling. His performance was impressive and thus became the captain of the team.

Return to Kitchee
After a successful loan spell in Sapling, Tsang Chi Hau returned Kitchee and became a first team player of Kitchee.

On loan to Pegasus
On 8 January 2019, Tsang was sent on loan to Pegasus. He had struggled with injuries during the first half of the season and was sent on loan by Eastern in order to regain his match fitness.

On loan to Yuen Long
On 9 August 2019, it was revealed that Tsang has joined Yuen Long.

Happy Valley
On 1 June 2020, Happy Valley confirmed that Tsang would return to the club for the second half of the season. Not long after signing with the club, Tsang tore his anterior cruciate ligament, requiring two operations. He resumed training on 4 January 2021.

Personal life
In 2019, Tsang obtained his AFC C coaching license.

Career statistics

Club
As of 7 October 2012

Honours

Club
Eastern
 Hong Kong Premier League: 2015–16
 Hong Kong Senior Shield: 2015–16

Kitchee
 Hong Kong Premier League: 2014–15
 Hong Kong First Division: 2013–14
 Hong Kong FA Cup: 2012–13, 2014–15
 Hong Kong League Cup: 2014–15

References

External links
 
 

1990 births
Living people
Association football defenders
Hong Kong footballers
Hong Kong First Division League players
Hong Kong Premier League players
Dreams Sports Club players
Kitchee SC players
Eastern Sports Club footballers
Happy Valley AA players
Tai Chung FC players
TSW Pegasus FC players
Yuen Long FC players
Hong Kong international footballers